La Montaña Airport ,  is an airstrip  east of Curicó, a city in the Maule Region of Chile.

The airstrip is in the valley of the Teno River, near the point where it enters the Chilean Central Valley from the Andes foothills. There is high and mountainous terrain in all quadrants except southwest.

See also

Transport in Chile
List of airports in Chile

References

External links
OpenStreetMap - La Montaña
OurAirports - La Montaña
FallingRain - La Montaña Airport

Airports in Maule Region